Bhrugubanda is a village in Palnadu district of Indian state of Andhra Pradesh. It is located in Sattenapalle mandal of Guntur revenue division. It forms a part of Andhra Pradesh Capital Region.

Governance 
Bhrugubanda gram panchayat is the local self-government of the village. It is divided into wards and each ward is represented by a ward member. The elected members of the gram panchayat is headed by a sarpanch.

References 

Villages in Palnadu district